Xaa-Pro dipeptidyl-peptidase (X-prolyl dipeptidyl aminopeptidase, PepX, X-prolyl dipeptidyl peptidase is an enzyme. It catalyses the following chemical reaction

 Hydrolyses Xaa-Pro bonds to release unblocked, N-terminal dipeptides from substrates including Ala-Pro-p-nitroanilide and (sequentially) Tyr-Pro--Phe-Pro--Gly-Pro--Ile

The intracellular enzyme from Lactococcus lactis (190-kDa) is the type example of peptidase family S15.

References

External links 
 

EC 3.4.14